Mount Solus is a conspicuous, isolated mountain (1,290 m) in the center and near the mouth of Weyerhaeuser Glacier, in southern Graham Land, the northernmost part of the mainland of Antarctica. It has steep rock sides meeting in a sharp summit ridge. Photographed from the air by Falkland Islands Dependencies Survey (FIDS) in August 1947, and by Ronne Antarctic Research Expedition (RARE) (Trimetrogon photography) in December 1947. Surveyed by FIDS in December 1958. The United Kingdom Antarctic Place-Names Committee (UK-APC) name is descriptive of the isolated position of the feature.

Mountains of Graham Land
Bowman Coast
Fallières Coast